Umberto Pinardi (born May 22, 1928, in Parma) is a retired Italian professional football player and coach.

Honours
 Coppa Italia winner: 1958.

External links

1928 births
Living people
Italian footballers
Serie A players
Serie B players
Como 1907 players
Juventus F.C. players
Udinese Calcio players
S.S. Lazio players
Italian football managers
Pisa S.C. managers
Ternana Calcio managers
Palermo F.C. managers
Brescia Calcio managers
S.P.A.L. managers
Modena F.C. managers

Association football midfielders
S.G. Gallaratese A.S.D. players